Chellie Marie Pingree (née Johnson; born April 2, 1955) is an American politician serving as the U.S. representative for  since 2009. Her district includes most of the southern part of the state, including Portland and Augusta.

A member of the Democratic Party, Pingree was a member of the Maine Senate from 1992 to 2000, serving as majority leader for her last four years. She ran for the United States Senate in 2002, losing to incumbent Republican Susan Collins. From 2003 until 2006, she was president and CEO of Common Cause. She is the first Democratic woman elected to the U.S. House of Representatives from Maine.

Early life, education, and early career
Pingree was born Rochelle Marie Johnson, in Minneapolis, Minnesota, the daughter of Harry and Dorothy Johnson. She moved to Maine as a teenager and had her first name legally changed to Chellie. She attended the University of Southern Maine and graduated from College of the Atlantic with a degree in human ecology. Since graduating from College of the Atlantic, she has resided on North Haven, a small island community off the coast of Rockland.

Pingree held various farming and care-taking jobs until 1981, when she started North Island Yarn, a cottage industry of hand knitters with a retail store on North Haven. Her business expanded and became North Island Designs, employing as many as ten workers. They began marketing knitting kits and pattern books nationwide through 1,200 retail stores and 100,000 mail-order catalogues. Through North Island Designs, Pingree authored and produced five knitting books between 1986 and 1992. Eisenhower Fellowships selected her as a USA Eisenhower Fellow in 1997.

Common Cause
As the leader of Common Cause, Pingree was active in the organization's programs in media reform, elections, ethics, and money in politics. She supported net neutrality, mandatory voter-verified paper ballots, public financing of congressional elections, national popular vote (a workaround for the Electoral College), and an independent ethics commission for Congress. She stepped down from Common Cause in February 2007 to return to her home state and run for Congress in 2008.

Maine Senate

Elections
Pingree was first elected in 1992. She was outspoken against going to war against Iraq, although counseled by party insiders to avoid that subject. She was reelected in 1994 and 1996. In 2000, she was unable to seek reelection due to term limits.

Tenure
Pingree represented Knox County in the Maine Senate. She was elected Maine's second female majority leader in 1996.

During her tenure as a state legislator, Pingree made nationwide headlines when she authored the nation's first bill regulating prescription drug prices, Maine Rx. She also shepherded Maine's largest land-bill initiative, Land for Maine's Future.

2002 U.S. Senate campaign

In 2002, Pingree ran for the U.S. Senate seat held by Republican junior U.S. Senator Susan Collins. Collins, a popular moderate incumbent, won by a margin of 17%.

U.S. House of Representatives

Elections
2008

In April 2007, Pingree filed papers for her bid to run for Maine's 1st congressional district.

On August 15, 2007, EMILY's List endorsed Pingree for Congress .<ref name="EL endorsement">EMILY's List Announces Endorsement of Chellie Pingree for Maine 1st District EMILY'S List, press release Accessed 2008-03-05</ref> In December 2007, she was endorsed by 21st Century Democrats. She was endorsed by a number of labor organizations and many individuals and state officials, including Congressman Rush D. Holt, Jr.; Congresswoman Jan Schakowsky; Maine Senate Majority Leader Libby Mitchell; former Maine Senate Assistant Majority Leader Anne Rand; State Representative Paulette Beaudoin; progressive writer and activist Jim Hightower; the United Auto Workers; Planned Parenthood, and the League of Conservation Voters.

Pingree was elected to the U.S. House of Representatives on November 4, 2008. She was sworn in on January 6, 2009.

2010

Pingree was reelected in 2010, defeating Republican nominee Dean Scontras by a 57–43 margin. She overcame strong anti-Democrat and anti-incumbent political sentiment to become just one of eight House Democrats to receive a higher percentage of the vote than in 2008.

2012

On February 29, 2012, an Associated Press story mentioned that Pingree was starting to circulate petitions to run for the U.S. Senate seat vacated by the retirement of Olympia Snowe, which she confirmed on The Rachel Maddow Show later that night. She withdrew her name from the race on March 7 and was reelected to the House.

2016

In 2016, Pingree defeated Republican nominee Mark Holbrook by around 16 points.

2018

In late 2017, Pingree's name was mentioned as a potential Democratic candidate for governor of Maine, to succeed term-limited incumbent Paul LePage. In mid-December, she announced plans to run for reelection to the House. Pingree defeated Holbrook again by around 26 points.

2020

Pingree was reelected, defeating Republican nominee Jay Allen.

2022

Pingree was reelected in 2022, defeating Republican nominee Edwin Thelander by 24 percentage points.

Tenure
Soon after her election, Pingree joined the Congressional Progressive Caucus, of which she is now vice chair. In September 2010, a video surfaced on the internet showing Pingree at Portland International Jetport disembarking from a private jet owned by her then-fiancé, hedge fund manager S. Donald Sussman. This drew criticism due to past statements Pingree made critical of legislators using private aircraft. Pingree declined to respond. The House Ethics Committee, in a bipartisan letter, stated the travel was permissible under House ethics rules.

Legislation sponsored
On May 23, 2013, Pingree introduced the York River Wild and Scenic River Study Act of 2013 (H.R. 2197; 113th Congress). If passed, the bill would require the National Park Service (NPS) to study a segment of the York River in Maine for potential addition to the Wild and Scenic Rivers System. The study would determine how the proposed designation would affect recreational and commercial activities. The study would cost approximately $500,000.

Committee assignments
Committee on Appropriations (2013–present)
Subcommittee on Agriculture, Rural Development, Food and Drug Administration, and Related Agencies
Subcommittee on Interior, Environment, and Related Agencies

Past
Committee on Agriculture (2009–2012)
Subcommittee on Conservation, Energy, and Forestry
Subcommittee on Nutrition and Horticulture
Committee on Armed Services (2009–2012)
Subcommittee on Military Personnel
Subcommittee on Seapower and Projection Forces

Caucus memberships
Congressional Progressive Caucus (Vice Chair)
Congressional Arts Caucus
Afterschool Caucuses
Blue Collar Caucus
United States Congressional International Conservation Caucus
Medicare for All Caucus

Political positions

Pingree is opposed to granting the president fast track authority in negotiating trade agreements, having voted against doing so on June 12, 2015. She said that such agreements need more transparency and debate, not less.

Pingree helped draft the Fair Elections Now Act, a proposal to provide public Fair Elections funding for popular candidates who raised a sufficient number of small local contributions. She has spoken out against the 2011 Supreme Court ruling McComish v. Bennett, which limits public financing systems for congressional campaigns.

Pingree has consistently voted against aggressive foreign policy. In March 2011, she voted for a resolution to remove forces from Afghanistan. In June 2011, she voted for House Resolution 292, preventing President Barack Obama from deploying ground forces in Libya.

In 2017, Pingree did not attend the inauguration of Donald Trump, instead visiting a Planned Parenthood center and a business owned by immigrants. She attended the 2017 Women's March the next day and stood on stage with other politicians who had refused to attend the inauguration. In July 2019, Pingree joined 95 Democrats voting for an impeachment resolution against Trump. Maine representative Jared Golden and 136 other Democrats joined all Republicans to kill the resolution.

In July 2019, Pingree voted against H. Res. 246 - 116th Congress, a House Resolution introduced by Brad Schneider opposing efforts to boycott the State of Israel and the Global Boycott, Divestment, and Sanctions Movement targeting Israel. The resolution passed 398–17.

On December 18, 2019, Pingree voted to impeach Trump.

Alongside her House colleagues, Pingree has urged President Joe Biden to declare a national climate emergency. She supports Alexandria Ocasio-Cortez's Green New Deal resolution.

Syria
In 2023, Pingree was among 56 Democrats to vote in favor of H.Con.Res. 21 which directed President Joe Biden to remove U.S. troops from Syria within 180 days.https://www.usnews.com/news/politics/articles/2023-03-08/house-votes-down-bill-directing-removal-of-troops-from-syria

Electoral history

Personal life
Pingree has three children; the oldest, Hannah Pingree, is the former Speaker of the Maine House of Representatives. On June 18, 2011, Pingree married S. Donald Sussman, a hedge fund manager, in a private ceremony at the couple's home in North Haven, Maine.

Until June 1, 2015, Sussman owned a 75% stake in MaineToday Media, the owners of the Portland Press Herald, Kennebec Journal, and Morning Sentinel'', in addition to sitting on the board of directors. Articles in those papers that discussed Pingree carried a disclaimer noting her marriage to Sussman.

Sussman completed the sale of his stake in MaineToday Media on June 1, 2015.

Pingree released a statement on September 8, 2015, announcing her separation and beginning of divorce proceedings from Sussman. She called it an "amicable and truly mutual decision". They divorced in the summer of 2016.

Pingree and her daughter Hannah co-own the Nebo Lodge Inn & Restaurant on Maine's North Haven Island.

See also

 Women in the United States House of Representatives

References

Sources

External links

Congresswoman Chellie Pingree official U.S. House website
Campaign webpage

|-

|-

1955 births
21st-century American politicians
21st-century American women politicians
American Lutherans
College of the Atlantic alumni
Democratic Party members of the United States House of Representatives from Maine
Female members of the United States House of Representatives
Living people
Lutherans from Maine
Majority leaders of the Maine Senate
People from North Haven, Maine
Politicians from Minneapolis
University of Southern Maine alumni
Women state legislators in Maine